The 2002 Virginia 500 was the eighth stock car race of the 2002 NASCAR Winston Cup Series and the 53rd iteration of the event. The race was held on Sunday, April 14, 2002, in Martinsville, Virginia at Martinsville Speedway, a  permanent oval-shaped short track. The race took the scheduled 500 laps to complete. At race's end, Bobby Labonte, driving for Joe Gibbs Racing, would hold off the field on the final restart with seven to go to win his 19th career NASCAR Winston Cup Series win and his first and only win of the season. To fill out the podium, Matt Kenseth of Roush Racing and Tony Stewart of Joe Gibbs Racing would finish second and third, respectively.

Background 

Martinsville Speedway is an NASCAR-owned stock car racing track located in Henry County, in Ridgeway, Virginia, just to the south of Martinsville. At 0.526 miles (0.847 km) in length, it is the shortest track in the NASCAR Cup Series. The track was also one of the first paved oval tracks in NASCAR, being built in 1947 by H. Clay Earles. It is also the only remaining race track that has been on the NASCAR circuit from its beginning in 1948.

Entry list 

 (R) denotes rookie driver.

 (R) denotes rookie driver.

*Harvick was barred from driving on Sunday due to actions caused at the 2002 Advance Auto Parts 250. As a result, Kenny Wallace would replace him for the race.

Practice

First practice 
The first practice session was held on Friday, April 12, at 11:20 AM EST, and would last for two hours.

Second practice 
The second practice session was held on Saturday, April 13, at 10:30 AM EST, and would last for 45 minutes.

Third and final practice 
The third and final practice session, sometimes referred to as Happy Hour, was held on Saturday, April 13, at 12:15 PM EST, and would last for 45 minutes.

Qualifying 
Qualifying was held on Friday, April 12, at 3:05 PM EST. Each driver would have two laps to set a fastest time; the fastest of the two would count as their official qualifying lap. Positions 1-36 would be decided on time, while positions 37-43 would be based on provisionals. Six spots are awarded by the use of provisionals based on owner's points. The seventh is awarded to a past champion who has not otherwise qualified for the race. If no past champ needs the provisional, the next team in the owner points will be awarded a provisional.

Randy Renfrow was the only driver to fail to qualify.

Full qualifying results

Race results

References 

2002 NASCAR Winston Cup Series
NASCAR races at Martinsville Speedway
April 2002 sports events in the United States
2002 in sports in Virginia